Roy Allen Hartzell (July 6, 1881 – November 6, 1961), played in Major League Baseball from 1906 to 1916.

Hartzell started his career with the St. Louis Browns (now known as the Baltimore Orioles), and was later traded to the New York Highlanders (now New York Yankees) for two other players, Jimmy Austin and Frank LaPorte.

Early life
Hartzell was born on July 6, 1881, in Golden, Colorado.  His parents were James and Nellie Hartzell from Illinois.  James G. Hartzell was a Civil War veteran and died and is buried in California. Hertzel had two brothers named Lester and Harry. Lester was a mining engineer and a professor at the State School of Mines in Colorado.  Lester was quarterback of the Mines football team.  Harry was involved in tourism operations in the Golden community.

Roy Hartzell played baseball and football in the Denver area. Hartzell worked in the smelters in Montana before signing with the pros. He married Ella Stebbins in Philadelphia in April 1911. She was also from Golden. He had some business in the Golden area working with rentals and sales.

Major Leagues
Hartzell was 24 years old when he played his first game in the big leagues on April 17, 1906, with the St. Louis Browns.  He played many positions including second base, third base, shortstop, and outfield in each of his 11 seasons of baseball.  At the plate he batted left-handed, but threw right-handed.  He stood about 5 foot 8 inches tall, and weighed 155 pounds.

On October 3, 1911, New York was playing the Boston Red Sox.  Jack Lewis of Boston was pulling a steal and collided with Hartzell and had to be replaced by a pinch runner named Duffy Lewis.  The two Lewises are of no relation.

Hartzell  played in 1,290 games with a life-time batting average of .252.  His last MLB game was on July 25, 1916. He signed to play for the 1917 Toledo Iron Men of the American Association.

Accomplishments
On July 12, 1911 when Hartzell was the cleanup hitter, he hit a 3-run double and another double in the same inning, then added a sacrifice fly and a grand slam, driving in a total of 8 runs.  It was a Major League record until Jimmy Foxx had 9 RBI in a game in 1933.

Hartzell's 595 at-bats for the Browns led the American League in 1909, and his 91 RBI for New York in 1911 were the most by a player in the Yankees' first 13 years.

Later years
Hartzell died on November 6, 1961, in Golden, Colorado, his birthplace.  He was buried in Golden Cemetery.

See also
List of Major League Baseball career stolen bases leaders

References

External links

Baseball Library
Baseball Almanac 

1881 births
1961 deaths
Major League Baseball outfielders
Major League Baseball third basemen
St. Louis Browns players
New York Highlanders players
Baseball players from Colorado
People from Golden, Colorado
Minor league baseball managers
Kansas City Blue Stockings players
Denver Grizzlies (baseball) players
Peoria Distillers players
Des Moines Underwriters players
St. Paul Saints (AA) players
Baltimore Orioles (IL) players
Toledo Iron Men players
Iola Gasbags players